The 1997 Asian Super Cup was the 3rd Asian Super Cup, a football match played between the winners of the previous season's Asian Club Championship and Asian Cup Winners Cup competitions. The 1997 competition was contested by Pohang Steelers of South Korea, who won the 1996–97 Asian Club Championship, and Al Hilal of Saudi Arabia, the winners of the 1996–97 Asian Cup Winners' Cup.

Route to the Super Cup

Pohang Steelers 

1Pohang Steelers goals always recorded first.

Al Hilal 

1 Al Hilal goals always recorded first. 
2 Al Qadisiyah withdrew 
3 Al Nasr withdrew after 1st leg

Game summary 

|}

First leg

Second leg

References
Asian Super Cup 1997

Asian Super Cup
Super
1997
1997
S
Al Hilal SFC matches